The 2020–21 Wyoming Cowboys basketball team represented the University of Wyoming during the 2020–21 NCAA Division I men's basketball season. They were be led by Jeff Linder in his first year as head coach at Wyoming. The Cowboys played their home games at the Arena-Auditorium in Laramie, Wyoming as members of the Mountain West Conference. In a season limited due to the ongoing COVID-19 pandemic, the Cowboys finished the season 14–11, 7–9 in Mountain West play to finish in seventh place. They defeated San Jose State in the first round of the Mountain West tournament before losing to San Diego State in the quarterfinals.

Previous season
The Cowboys finished the 2019–20 season 9–24, 2–16 in Mountain West play to finish in last place in the conference. As the 11 seed in the Mountain West tournament, they upset Colorado State and Nevada to reach the semifinals, where they lost to Utah State. They became the first ever 11 seed to win a game at the Mountain West tournament.

On March 9, 2020, head coach Allen Edwards was fired. He finished at Wyoming with a four-year record of 60–76. On March 17, the school announced that Northern Colorado head coach Jeff Linder had been named head coach.

Offseason

Departures

Incoming transfers

Recruiting classes

2020 recruiting class

2021 recruiting class

Roster

Statistics

Schedule and results
The beginning of the season was delayed until November 25 as a result of the ongoing COVID–19 pandemic. The Mountain West conference announced changes to the conference schedule  that included a 20-game conference slate, and the school announced the non-conference portion of their schedule November 10. 
|-
!colspan=9 style=|Non-Conference

|-
!colspan=9 style=|Mountain West Conference

|-
!colspan=9 style=| Mountain West tournament

Source

References

Wyoming Cowboys basketball seasons
Wyoming
Wyoming Cowboys bask
Wyoming Cowboys bask